Ruth Godfrey may refer to:

 Ruth Godfrey (poker player), American poker player
 Ruth Godfrey (actress) (1922–1985), American film actress